Aida Obuća (born 9 July 1975) is a Bosnian politician who is a member of the Federal House of Peoples. She previously served as Prime Minister of the Bosnian-Podrinje Canton Goražde from 2019 to 2022.

Early life and education
Aida Obuća (née Džaferović) was born on July 9th, 1975 in the town of Goražde SR Bosnia and Herzegovina, SFR Yugoslavia, present-day Bosnia and Herzegovina. in a large family. She finished her primary and secondary education in Goražde, and later continued her higher education at the University of Sarajevo Law school, where she obtained a bachelor's degree in law.

Wartime period
After the aggression against Bosnia and Herzegovina started as a minor she enlisted as a volunteer in the Army of the Republic of Bosnia and Herzegovina in Goražde where she remained until the war was ended with the signing of the Dayton Agreement.

During her time as a volunteer she served in the logistical division and later on as a legal professional in the District military court in Goražde

Career in sports
She started her sports career in the Women's Handball Club "Radnički" Goražde, and after its transformation in 1993. she continued it in the new handball club "Goražde." Until 1996. due to the well-known wartime siege, the team performed only within the Goražde District present-day Goražde. In  the 1996 championships the women's team won third place and became the representative of Bosnia and Herzegovina in the EHF Cup. In October 1996, for the first time in the history of Goražde sports, a team from Goražde played in the European Cup against the team from Amsterdam.

In the 1997/98 season. the Women's Handball Club "Goražde" functions as an independent club and wins the BiH Cup, defeating the team "Zmaj od Bosne" from Tuzla in the final, thereby securing once again their participation in the European Cup Winners' Cup, where they lost from team "Valencia" from Spain.

With the before mentioned accomplishments Obuća won the title of the best athlete of Goražde and entered her name in the hall of fame of ŽRK "Goražde."

Professional career
Along with her sports career, she continued her professional development and in 1995. was promoted to the Cantonal Court in Goražde, where she remained until 2006. when she was appointed as head of the department for legal and economic affairs of the Public enterprise Bosansko-Podrinjska šume (English: Bosnian-Podrinje forest agency).

Political career
Obuća began her political career in the Party of Democratic Action, where she became the first female election list leader as a candidate in the local elections in the Municipality of Goražde present-day town of Goražde and later in the general elections in the Bosnian-Podrinje Canton Goražde.

In 2008, she won a mandate in the municipal council and soon progressed to the position of deputy chairman and chairman of the municipal council. In 2012, she renewed her mandate and was elected by her fellow councilors as head of the club

President of the Assembly of Bosnian-Podrinje Canton Goražde
After the general elections of 2014 she was elected as a member of parliament in the Assembly of the Bosnian-Podrinje Canton Goražde, where as a representative of the Bosniak people, she assumed the position of President of the Assembly, making her the first female to hold that position since the cantons founding.

Prime Minister of Bosnian-Podrinje Canton Goražde
After the victory of the Party of Democratic Action in the general elections held in Bosnia and Herzegovina in 2018 and with the firm support of the parliamentary majority Aida Obuća was elected to the office of Prime minister of Bosnian-Podrinje canton Goražde at the session of the Assembly on April 26th, 2019. making history as the first woman ever to hold the office in the entity Federation of Bosnia and Herzegovina.

First government

The composition of this Government consisted of Prime minister Aida Obuća (SDA), Minister of Health, Social Policy, Refugees and Displaced Persons Eniz Halilović (SDA), Minister of Justice, Administration and Labor Relations Nataša Danojlić (SDA), Minister of Finance Šemso Muslić (NBL). , Minister of Urban Planning, Spatial Planning and Environmental Protection Bojan Krunić (NBL), Minister of Veteran Affairs Edin Aganović (SBiH), Minister of Economy Mensad Arnaut (A-SDA/Independent Bloc), Minister of the Interior Nizama Rišljanin (Goraždanska priča) and Minister for youth, education, science, culture and sport by Arman Bešli (DF).

Political turbulence and second government
After difficult political circumstances and the destabilization of the previous coalition, there is a change in the composition of the Government and on the position of vice-president of the Assembly. Aida Sirbubalo (DF) deposed her party colleague Edita Velić, and was elected as the new vice-president, and Nermin Karišik and later Armin Mandžo were appointed as the new ministers of internal affairs. MEP Daliborka Milović stated that the session represented a violation of the Rules of Procedure and the Constitution, and that the decisions made had no legal validity, but all allegations were ultimately rejected by the Constitutional court of the Federation of Bosnia and Herzegovina and the Office of the High Representative.

Term as Prime Minister
During Obuća's term she managed to rehabilitate the financial deficit in the amount of 10,000,000.00 KM and achieve significant progress in the fight against corruption. She made a special contribution in the international representation of Bosnian-Podrinje Canton Goražde, for which she received commendations from the OSCE mission in Bosnia and Herzegovina as well as numerous embassies.

Some of the most significant projects that she initiated and implemented were: the construction of the first Hemodialysis center, the construction of the central memorial to the veterans of Goražde, and the construction of the "Building for Youth."

After the end of the general elections in 2022, she resigned from the office of Prime minister and was elected delegate in the Club of Bosniaks of the House of Peoples of the Parliament of the Federation of Bosnia and Herzegovina. The election of Obuća as a delegate ensured an absolute majority for the Party of Democratic Action.

Party activity
After the resignation of Mirsad Žuga to the position of president of the cantonal organization, Obuća took over the management and stabilized the political situation within the party. In parallel with that process, she was elected to the position of delegate in the Main board of SDA at the 2019. party congress. After the resignation of Aljoša Čampara in the mandate of Bakir Izetbegović, she was appointed as the member of the presidency of SDA.

References

1975 births
Living people
People from Goražde
Bosnia and Herzegovina politicians
Politicians of the Federation of Bosnia and Herzegovina
Party of Democratic Action politicians